Pseudamphilochus is a monotypic genus of crustaceans belonging to the monotypic family Pseudamphilochidae. The only species is Pseudamphilochus shoemakeri.

The species is found in Antarctica.

References

Amphipoda
Monotypic crustacean genera